"Miss You 2" is a song by English singer-songwriter Gabrielle Aplin and Scottish singer-songwriter Nina Nesbitt, released on 3 January 2020 through Never Fade Records and AWAL.

Background
The song is a new version of 2016's "Miss You". Aplin and Nesbitt have been long-term friends and a collaboration is something that both fans and the artists have wanted for years. When talking about the song, Nesbitt said, "I'm so excited to be featuring on Gabrielle's new version of 'Miss You'. We have known each other for a long time and one of my first ever gigs was supporting her at a gig in 2011. I've always been a big fan of her work and I'm so happy we've finally had the chance to collaborate." Aplin said, "I'm so happy to have Nina on 'Miss You'. We came through as artists around the same time. We have been of both sides of an ever-changing industry and both decided to independently take control of our careers and success. The initial release of 'Miss You' feels like the start of that for me, and I'm thrilled that Nina has added her voice to a new version of one of my favourite songs of mine."

Charts

Release history

References

2020 songs
2020 singles
Gabrielle Aplin songs
Nina Nesbitt songs